Walpersbach is a municipality in the district of Wiener Neustadt-Land in the Austrian state of Lower Austria.

Geography 
Walpersbach in the Industrieviertel (industrial area) in Lower Austria.
Cadastral communities are Klingfurth, Schleinz and Walpersbach.

Population

Politics 
Mayor of the municipality is Franz Breitsching, chief officer Elisabeth Hafenscher.

References

Cities and towns in Wiener Neustadt-Land District